"Out, Out—" is a 1916 single stanza poem authored by American poet Robert Frost, relating the accidental death of a young boy, with references to Shakespeare's Macbeth.

Background
The poem was written in memory of 16-year-old Raymond Tracy Fitzgerald, whom Frost had befriended while living in Franconia, New Hampshire. Fitzgerald had died on March 24, 1910, after an accident similar to the accident related in "Out, Out—".

The poem was first published in the July 1916 issue of McClure's before being included in the collection Mountain Interval.

Analysis
"Out Out—" tells the story of a young boy who dies after his hand is severed by a "buzz-saw". The poem focuses on people's reactions to death, as well as the death itself, one of the main ideas being that life goes on. The boy lost his hand to a buzzsaw and bled so much that he went into shock, dying in spite of his doctor's efforts.
Frost uses personification to great effect throughout the poem. The buzz saw, although technically an inanimate object, is described as a cognizant being—"snarling" and "rattling" repeatedly, as well as "leaping" out at the boy's hand in excitement.

Frost concentrates on the apparent innocence and passivity of the boy—which is relevant to the time period—as Frost was forced to move back to America due to war in Britain just a year before the poem was written. Bearing this in mind, the poem can be read as a critique as to how warfare can force innocent, young boys to leave their childhood behind, and ultimately be destroyed by circumstances created by the "responsible" adult.

The title of the poem is an allusion to William Shakespeare's tragedy Macbeth ("Out, out, brief candle ..." in the Tomorrow and tomorrow and tomorrow soliloquy). Macbeth is shocked to hear of his wife's death and comments on the brevity of life. It refers to how unpredictable and fragile life is.

The poem uses figurative language including onomatopoeia, alliteration, imagery, and many others. Harold Bloom noted that it is "one of Frost's most respected poems, but it has not received the same depth of critical attention and explication as poems such as 'The Road Not Taken' and 'Stopping by Woods on a Snowy Evening.'"

References

Sources
Nancy Lewis Tuten; John Zubizarreta (2001). The Robert Frost Encyclopedia. Greenwood Publishing Group. ISBN 978-0-313-29464-8.
Jay Parini (2000). Robert Frost: A Life. Macmillan. ISBN 978-0-8050-6341-7.
Jeffrey Meyers (1996). Robert Frost: a biography. Houghton Mifflin. ISBN 9780395856031.

Poetry by Robert Frost
1900s poems
1916 poems
American poems
Modernist poems